Richard Mifflin Kleberg Sr. (November 18, 1887 – May 8, 1955), a Democrat, was a seven-term member of the United States House of Representatives from Texas's 14th congressional district over the period 1931–1945 and an heir to the King Ranch in South Texas. He was first elected in 1931 in a special election called due to the death of Harry M. Wurzbach.  His election caused the Democratic party to achieve an absolute majority in the House of Representatives --- a majority it retained for all but four of the next sixty-three years. He was elected unopposed in 1940 and 1942. Lyndon B. Johnson served as a congressional secretary under Kleberg from 1931 until his appointment as head of the Texas National Youth Administration in 1935. As described by Johnson biographer Robert Caro, Kleberg was a staunch conservative, and took a dim view of President Franklin D. Roosevelt and the New Deal, which he regarded as socialist if not outright Communist in character. Nevertheless, he was persuaded by Lyndon Johnson to vote for certain key New Deal policies that he personally opposed when it was brought to his attention that they enjoyed significant support among his constituents.

He was a member of the Miller group in Washington.

See also
United States congressional delegations from Texas

References

External links

http://www.king-ranch.com/legend.htm
The Political Graveyard: Index to Politicians: Kittredge to Kleier at politicalgraveyard.com

1887 births
1945 deaths
People from Corpus Christi, Texas
University of Texas at Austin alumni
Ranchers from Texas
Kleberg family
Death in Arkansas
People from Kleberg County, Texas
Texas lawyers
Democratic Party members of the United States House of Representatives from Texas
20th-century American politicians
20th-century American lawyers